Santitorn Lattirom (born June 23, 1990) is a Thai professional footballer who plays as a midfielder for Thai League 2 club Rajpracha.

References

External links

1990 births
Living people
Santitorn Lattirom
Santitorn Lattirom
Association football midfielders
Samutsongkhram F.C. players
Santitorn Lattirom
Santitorn Lattirom
Santitorn Lattirom